Acromyrmex fracticornis is a species of leaf-cutter ant, a New World ant of the subfamily Myrmicinae of the genus Acromyrmex. This species is from one of the two genera of advanced attines (fungus-growing ants) within the tribe Attini.  It is found in the wild naturally in southern Brazil, Paraguay and northern Argentina.

Acromyrmex fracticornis colony densities are positively correlated with basal grass coverage and the amount of grazing damage. A. fracticornis preferentially harvested tender grass blades that showed little or no previous damage by other invertebrates. They preferentially harvest Digitaria smutsii and Panicum maximum more often than other species, and Pennisetum purpureum, Pennisetum ciliare and Brachiaria decumbens were selected significantly less often.

Synonyms 
 Acromyrmex jorgenseni Gonçalves, 1961
 Moellerius fracticornis Forel, 1909

See also
List of leafcutter ants

References

Acromyrmex
Insects described in 1909
Hymenoptera of South America